Miles Chadwick (10 March 1880 – 1940) was an English footballer who played in the Football League for Blackburn Rovers.

References

1880 births
1940 deaths
English footballers
Association football forwards
English Football League players
Darwen F.C. players
Blackburn Rovers F.C. players